The 2012–13 Tennessee Tech Golden Eagles men's basketball team represented Tennessee Technological University during the 2012–13 NCAA Division I men's basketball season. The Golden Eagles, led by second year head coach Steve Payne, played their home games at the Eblen Center and were members of the East Division of the Ohio Valley Conference. They finished the season 12–17, 5–11 in OVC play to finish in last place in the East Division. They failed to qualify for the Ohio Valley Conference tournament.

Roster

Schedule

|-
!colspan=9| Regular season

References

Tennessee Tech Golden Eagles men's basketball seasons
Tennessee Tech